Edmonton Ski Club is located Gallagher Park, on the south side of the North Saskatchewan River valley adjacent to downtown Edmonton, in the community of. The top of the hill yields an excellent view of Edmonton's downtown core, behind the Muttart Conservatory.

The Edmonton Ski Club is a not-for-profit Society established in 1911. During the winter months, the hill is open to the public and offers skiing and snowboarding on machine-made, groomed snow. The hill has four surface lifts including 2 Poma handle tow lifts, a T-Bar and a 280 foot long SunKid carpet lift, installed in 2019. In August of each year, these same slopes become seating areas for the Edmonton Folk Music Festival.

Canadian Olympian Gold Medalist Jennifer Heil learned the sport of freestyle skiing at the Edmonton Ski Club.

The Edmonton Ski Club reopened in December 2019, following a one season closure.

See also
List of ski areas and resorts in Canada

References

External links
 Edmonton Ski Club

Ski areas and resorts in Alberta
Sports venues in Edmonton
Tourist attractions in Edmonton